Nagarabhavi (also referred to as Nagarbhavi)is a residential area of Bangalore, Karnataka, India. Located in West Bangalore, Nagarabhavi is located between Mysore Road and Magadi road.

It is surrounded by Vijaynagar on the north, Bangalore University and Chandra Layout on the east, Magadi road on the north and Sir.M.V.Layout on the west, and Kengeri to the south. Nagarabhavi is broadly divided into two areas, called Nagarabhavi 1st stage and Nagarabhavi 2nd stage.

Traditionally known as the home of Bangalore University, this area also houses the National Law School of India University and the Dr. Ambedkar Institute of Technology.

Nagarabhavi 1st stage comprises the localities of Maruthinagara, Kalyana Nagara, Nagarabhavi Village, Canara bank Colony, Bhairaveshwara Nagar and Moodala Palya amongst others. These areas are heavily populated and have much commercial activity along the Nagarabhavi main road. These areas now very well developed. It is also home to GnanaSoudha. It is definitely one of the peaceful residential areas in Bangalore. The nearest metro station is Vijaynagar or Attiguppe. It has very easy and near access to Outer Ring Road which makes commute easier. 

Nagarabhavi 2nd stage has wide roads and the road connectivity is laudable. Most of the roads here are now tarred, ending the age old woes of the people residing here. The BDA has divided Nagarabhavi 2nd stage into blocks 1–12. In addition, well planned residential localities like Annapoorneshwari Nagara, Vinayaka Layout, ITI Layout, MPM Layout, NGEF Layout and Papareddy Palya form a part of this area. Nagarabhavi has famous restaurants like Mane Ruchi, Swathi Restaurant and Nandana Palace. It also has access to good reading libraries like JustBooks and Central and Namma hotels. Many celebrities live in and around Nagarbhavi.

History
In Kannada, the language of a majority of the inhabitants of the city of Bangalore, Naagarabhaavi means literally "a well of snakes". It is not conclusively known, however, why it is called so. One school of thought is that the name is due to the high number of snakes present in the area. Also, some believe that it is called a "well" because of the surrounding hillocks that are no longer present due to urbanization. Nagarbhavi got its prime importance due to the establishment of Institute for Social and Economic Change (ISEC) in 1973. The site was chosen by Late Professor VKRV Rao for ISEC. A road was laid and that changed the culture of Naagarabhaavi, with professors from all over the country coming and settling down in this locality.  Local youth community Jai Maruthi Naagarabhaavi Yuvakara Sangha actively involving in the social work activities and won the  Karnataka State Youth Award in 2004.

References

External links 
 

Neighbourhoods in Bangalore